Hadiabad may refer to:

 Hadiabad (Phagwara), India
 Hadiabad, Darab, Fars Province, Iran
 Hadiabad, Fasa, Fars Province, Iran
 Hadiabad, Golestan, Iran
 Hadiabad, Hamadan, Iran
 Hadiabad, Kerman, Iran
 Hadiabad, Khuzestan, Iran
 Hadiabad, Lorestan, Iran
 Hadiabad, Qazvin, Iran